Manvini Bhavai is a 1993 Gujarati film directed Upendra Trivedi, starring Upendra Trivedi and Anuradha Patel in lead role. The film was produced by Upendra Trivedi and Aashish Trivedi. Based on an eponymous novel written by Indian writer Pannalal Patel, the film tells a love story of Kalu (Trivedi) and Raju (Patel), with a backdrop of rural setting of north Gujarat.

Cast
Upendra Trivedi
Anuradha Patel
Chandrakant Pandya
Kalpana Divan

Plot
The film narrates the story of farmer and his struggle to survive during the Indian famine of 1899–1900. With a backdrop of famine, it depicts a love story between Kalu (Trivedi) and Raju (Patel).

Accolades
The film won the National Film Award for Best Feature Film in Gujarati at the 41st National Film Awards. Producers Aashish Trivedi and Upendra Trivedi were awarded the Rajat Kamal and a cash prize of Rs. 20,000, while director Upendra Trivedi was awarded the Rajat Kamal and a cash prize of Rs. 20,000. The award was given for depicting the drought-torn lives of villagers through the eyes of the protagonist.

References

External links
 

Indian historical films